The Future Is Medieval is the fourth studio album released by English rock band Kaiser Chiefs. The album was made available through the band's official website on 3 June 2011, before being released in shops on 27 June. It is the final album to feature original drummer Nick Hodgson before his departure from the band in December 2012. The album was later re-issued in North America, under the new title Start the Revolution Without Me. This version of the album was released on 6 March 2012, and includes the brand new track "On the Run", plus tracks previously only available on the digital version of the album. Around the same time, a special limited edition vinyl box set was released through the band's official website in the United Kingdom, containing the entire twenty-three tracks from the digital deluxe version of the album, spread across four 10" vinyl records.

Background
Just days before the album was announced, a music video for the track "Little Shocks" was released online via the band's official website. The album's title is taken from the lyrics of the track "Child of the Jago". The album was uniquely promoted in the United Kingdom, as copies purchased from the band's website from 3 June could contain a track listing chosen by the purchaser. Each album could contain ten of any of the twenty-three tracks available on the digital deluxe version of the album, and each individual album artwork could be edited to the purchaser's design. Purchasers could also share their version of the album, and for every other buyer who chooses to purchase their version, they earn £1.

Track listing

The Future Is Medieval
All tracks written by Kaiser Chiefs.

Start the Revolution Without Me

Personnel
Ricky Wilson – vocals
Andrew 'Whitey' White – guitar
Nick Hodgson – drums, backing vocals, lead vocals on "Man on Mars" and "If You Will Have Me"
Simon Rix – bass
Nick "Peanut" Baines – keyboards
Tony Visconti – producer, engineer
Ethan Johns – producer, engineer
David Arnold – additional strings on several tracks
Tim Hodgson – additional lyrics on "If You Will Have Me"

Chart performance

References

2011 albums
Kaiser Chiefs albums
B-Unique Records albums
Fiction Records albums
Albums produced by Tony Visconti
Albums produced by Ethan Johns